Middle School: Get Me Out of Here! is the second novel in James Patterson's best selling Middle School series, preceded by Middle School: The Worst Years of My Life, both co-authored by Chris Tebbetts. It was published in the United States by Little, Brown and Company on May 7, 2012. The book is about Rafe Khatchadorian, who is starting seventh grade in his new art school as he trades Operation: R.A.F.E. for Operation: Get a Life and deals with different bullies.

Reception
Middle School: Get Me Out of Here! was a No. 1 New York Times Bestseller, an Indiebound Bestseller and one of Barnes & Noble's Best Books of 2012.

Sequels
 Middle School: My Brother Is a Big, Fat Liar (2013, with co-author Lisa Papademetriou) This book is told from Rafe's sister's point of view. Georgia starts middle school and makes a bet with Rafe that she can excel in places he failed. 
 Middle School: How I Survived Bullies, Broccoli, and Snake Hill (2013, with co-author Chris Tebbetts) This book is told from Rafe's point of view once again, about Rafe's experiences at Camp Wannamorra. 
 Middle School: Ultimate Showdown (22 May 2014, with co-author Julia Bergen) Stories and activities with Rafe and Georgia
 Middle School: Save Rafe! (9 October 2014, with co-author Chris Tebbetts) This book has Rafe on an outdoor survival course to get back in school.
 Middle School: Just My Rotten Luck (22 June 2015). Rafe returns to Hills Village Middle School, joins the football team, and plans a spectacular art project.
 Middle School: Dog's Best Friend
 Middle School: Escape to Australia
 Middle School: From Hero to Zero
 Middle School: Born to Rock
 Middle School: Master of Disaster
 Middle School: Field Trip Fiasco
 Middle School: It's a Zoo in Here! 

Related books
How I Got Lost in London (27 February 2014) World Book Day story, with Rafe on a school trip to England
Public School Superhero (7 May 2015, with co-author Chris Tebbetts) Kenny Wright is a 'Grandma's Boy' struggling with sixth grade in a tough inner city school. But in his imagination he is Stainlezz Steel, costumed crimefighter.  (UK title: Kenny Wright, Superhero)

Film adaptation 
James Patterson confirmed a sequel to Middle School: The Worst Years of My Life film is currently in development as of April 16, 2020.

References

External links

Middle School website
James Patterson's website

American children's novels
Young adult novels by James Patterson
2012 American novels
Novels set in high schools and secondary schools
2012 children's books
Little, Brown and Company books